This is a list of destinations that Dominican airline Caribair served (As of May 2009.)

Lists of airline destinations